Suty was a high official under the Ancient Egyptian king Ramses II. He was overseer of the treasuries and overseer of troops. As overseer of the treasuries he was responsible for the administraion of the commodities coming to the royal palace. Suty is known from his decorated tomb at El Khawaled (Mostagedda), in Upper Egypt. He is also known from a sarcophagus that is now in the Egyptian Museum at Cairo but most likely comes from this tomb. Shabtis with his name were found in burials of the Apis bulls at Saqqara. They were found close to Apis bulls that were buried in the year 16 and year 30 of the reign of Ramses II. In year 24 a certain Panehesi was in offices as overseer of the treasuries, before the latter Tia occupied this office, so that Suty must have been in office around year 30 of king Ramses II. This also indicates that Suty was involved in preparing the burials of these sacred animals. He is also known from several statues.

References 

Officials of the Nineteenth Dynasty of Egypt
Overseer of the treasury